Eleanor of Scotland (1433 – 20 November 1480) was an Archduchess of Austria by marriage to Sigismund, Archduke of Austria, a noted translator, and regent of Austria in 1455-58 and 1467. She was a daughter of James I of Scotland and Joan Beaufort.

Early life 
Eleanor was the sixth child of James I of Scotland and Joan Beaufort.  James I was known for his great love of literature which he passed on to Eleanor and her sister Margaret.

Starting in 1445, Eleanor lived at the court of Charles VII of France, where it was suggested that she should marry Frederick, King of the Romans. In 1447, she accompanied Marie of Anjou, Queen of France, on a pilgrimage on Mont Saint-Michel.

Marriage 
In 1448 or 1449 the teenage Eleanor married Sigismund (1427–1496), a Habsburg Duke, then Archduke of Further Austria, and finally ruler of Tyrol (from 1446 to 1490).

Eleanor served as regent for her husband from 1455 to 1458 and again in 1467.

Heinrich Steinhöwel dedicated his translation of Boccaccio's On Famous Women to Eleanor.

Translation 
Eleanor was a great lover of books and literate in several languages. She translated The History of the King's Son of Galicia, named Pontus, and the beautiful Sydonia (Pontus and Sidonia) from French to German. The French original passed through several editions between 1480 and 1550.

In addition to translating the work, Eleanor also revised it to increase the political power of women.  Only the courts with effective female advisors retained their political stability.

Based on the number of printings, it was a popular book.  A copy of the German translation, preserved in the library of Gotha, bears the date 1465.

Eleanor and Elisabeth von Nassau-Saarbrücken are credited with introducing the prose novel to German literature.

Death
Eleanor died giving birth to her son Wolfgang at Innsbruck on 20 November 1480 and was buried in Stams.

Gallery

References

1433 births
1480 deaths
Scottish princesses
House of Stuart
Austrian nobility
Scottish people of English descent
Austrian royal consorts
15th-century women rulers
Deaths in childbirth
Scottish translators
15th-century translators
French–German translators
15th-century Scottish women writers
15th-century viceregal rulers
Daughters of kings